John Calcraft the Younger (16 October 1765 – 11 September 1831), of Rempstone in Dorset and Ingress in Kent, was an English landowner and Member of Parliament.

The illegitimate son and principal heir of John Calcraft the Elder, a politician who had made a fortune as an army contractor, Calcraft inherited his father's estates while still a child. The property included control of the pocket borough of Wareham in Dorset, and while still three months short of coming of age he was returned as its Member of Parliament (MP) in 1786. He is not recorded as having spoken in the House during his first Parliament, and did not stand for re-election in 1790, but subsequently re-entered the House, representing Wareham again (1800–1806 and 1818–1831), Rochester (1806–1818) and Dorset (1831).

From 1800 until 1828, Calcraft was a Whig, and served briefly as a clerk of the ordnance (1806–1807) when the party held power under Lord Grenville. However, in 1828 he accepted office as Paymaster of the Forces in the Duke of Wellington's Tory administration, and was raised to the Privy Council; but he broke with the Tories over parliamentary reform and returned to the Whigs in March 1831, voting for the Reform Bill in the crucial division on the second reading when it passed by a single vote. He was elected as a reformer for the county in the election that followed shortly afterwards, but becoming convinced that both sides in the Commons despised him he became mentally unstable, and later the same year he committed suicide.

Calcraft married Elizabeth Hales, daughter of Sir Thomas Pym Hales, in 1790, and they had five surviving children. His two sons, John Hales Calcraft and Granby Calcraft, both became MPs for Wareham.

References
 
 Lewis Namier & John Brooke, The History of Parliament: The House of Commons 1754–1790 (London: HMSO, 1964)
 Michael Brock, The Great Reform Act (London: Hutchinson, 1973)

External links 
 

1765 births
1831 deaths
British MPs 1784–1790
English landowners
Members of the Parliament of the United Kingdom for English constituencies
Members of the Parliament of Great Britain for English constituencies
Members of the Privy Council of the United Kingdom
Tory MPs (pre-1834)
UK MPs 1801–1802
UK MPs 1802–1806
UK MPs 1806–1807
UK MPs 1807–1812
UK MPs 1812–1818
UK MPs 1818–1820
UK MPs 1820–1826
UK MPs 1826–1830
UK MPs 1830–1831
UK MPs 1831–1832
Whig (British political party) MPs for English constituencies
British politicians who committed suicide